École secondaire Franco-Jeunesse is a French high school in Sarnia, Ontario, Canada and is administered by the Conseil scolaire Viamonde. Franco-Jeunesse opened up a new school as of September 2012. The school was previously conjoined with NCIVS, but now neighbours SFX and the French community centre. It is well known in Sarnia for its advanced Technology and Robotics programs.

See also
List of high schools in Ontario
CSDCSO

External links 

High schools in Sarnia
French-language high schools in Ontario